The men's division of the 2022 PNVF Champions League began on November 5 to 13, 2022 at PhilSports Arena, Pasig, Philippines. This is the second edition of the PNVF Champions League.

Cignal HD Spikers claimed the championship title after a hard fought 5 sets against Pikit-North Cotabato AMC G-Spikers. Imus City-AJAA Spikers secured the bronze after a 3 sets win over PGJC Navy Sea Lions.

Participating teams
15 teams entered the 2022 PNVF Champions League.

Format 
The following format will be conducted for the entirety of the conference:
Preliminary Round
 Single-round robin preliminaries; 15 teams; 3 pools; Teams are ranked using the FIVB Ranking System.
 The top two teams in each pool and the top two of the third placed teams qualified for the final round
Quarterfinal round
 QF1: #A1 vs. 2nd best #3
 QF2: #C2 vs. #B2
 QF3: #B1 vs. 1st best #3
 QF4: #C1 vs. #A2
Semifinal round
 QF1 winner vs. QF2 winner
 QF3 winner vs. QF4 winner
Finals
 Bronze medal: SF1 Loser vs SF2 Loser
 Gold medal: SF1 Winner vs SF2 Winner

Venue

Pools composition
The 15 teams were divided into 5 teams in each pool.

Preliminary round
 All times are Philippine Standard Time (UTC+8:00).

Pool A

|}
 
|}

Pool B

|}
 
|}

Pool C

|}
 
|}

Ranking of the third placed teams

Final round
 All times are Philippines Standard Time (UTC+08:00)

Quarterfinals 
|}

Semifinals 
|}

3rd place match 
|}

Championship 
|}

Final standing

Awards

Most Valuable Player
 Marck Jesus Espejo (Cignal HD Spikers)
Best Setter
 Esmilzo Polvorosa (Imus City-AJAA Spikers)
Best Outside Spikers
 Joshua Umandal (Pikit-North Cotabato AMC G-Spikers)
 Marck Jesus Espejo (Cignal HD Spikers)

Best Middle Blockers
 John Paul Bugaoan (Cignal HD Spikers)
 Kim Niño Malabunga (Pikit-North Cotabato AMC G-Spikers)
Best Opposite Spiker
 Joeven Dela Vega (PGJC Navy Sea Lions)
Best Libero
 Manuel Sumanguid III (Cignal HD Spikers)

See also
2022 PNVF Champions League for Women

References

PNVF Champions League
C
C
C